486 Squadron or 486th Squadron may refer to:

 No. 486 Squadron RAAF, Australia
 No. 486 Squadron RNZAF, a New Zealand fighter unit of the Royal Air Force that served in Europe during World War II
 486th Aero Squadron, Air Service, United States Army
 486th Bombardment Squadron, United States Army Air Forces and United States Air Force
 486th Fighter Squadron, United States Army Air Forces
 486th Flight Test Squadron, United States Air Force